Una Leacy is a camogie player and winner of two All-Star awards. Leacy's first All-Star came in 2007, the year her two early goals helped Wexford win their first All-Ireland Senior Camogie Championship in 32 years, and her second in 2011. She won further All Ireland medals in 2010 and 2011.

Family background
Her sister Mary Leacy won two All Star awards with Wexford. She is a daughter of Margaret (née O'Leary) who was selected at left half-back on the camogie team of the century. Margaret's successes include three All-Ireland Seniors with Wexford in 1968, '69 and '75; seven Gael Linn Cups with Leinster in 1965, 1968, 1969, 1970, 1971, 1972 and 1978; five All-Ireland Clubs, with Eoghan Ruadh (Dublin) in 1967 and with Buffers Alley (Wexford) in 1978, 1981, 1982 and 1983; Gaelic All Star award 1968; captain of the first Wexford team to win the National Camogie League in 1977-'78. She plays for Oulart–The Ballagh.

Other awards
National League Division one 2009; All Star 2007; five All-Ireland Féile na nGael 1998, 1999, 2000, 2001, 2002 as captain (national record); Leinster Under-14 1999, 2000, 2001, 2002; Leinster Under-16 2002; Leinster and winner of All-Ireland Senior medals in Colleges with Coláiste Bríde in 2003, 2004, 2005; All-Ireland Junior Colleges in 2004 (captain); Leinster Junior 2003, 2004; Club Senior 2003, 2004, 2005, 2006, 2007, 2009; Leinster Club Senior 2009; Ashbourne Cup 2007, 2008; Leinster Senior 2007; shared 'Irish Independent/Jury's' sportstar of the week with her sister, Mary, after the 2007 Winner of All-Ireland Senior medals in final; Purple and Gold Star 2008.

References

Living people
Wexford camogie players
1988 births
UCD camogie players